The 21st ceremony of the Screen Actors Guild Awards, honoring the best achievements in film and television performances for the year 2014, took place on January 25, 2015, at the Shrine Auditorium in Los Angeles, California. The ceremony was broadcast on both TNT and TBS 8:00 p.m. EST / 5:00 p.m. PST and the nominees were announced on December 10, 2014.

Debbie Reynolds was announced as the 2014 SAG Life Achievement Award honoree on August 18, 2014.

Winners and nominees
Winners are listed first and highlighted in boldface.

Film

Television

Screen Actors Guild Life Achievement Award 
 Debbie Reynolds

In Memoriam
Liev Schreiber introduced the "In Memoriam" segment to pay tribute to the actors who have died in 2014:

Mickey Rooney
James Rebhorn
Ann B. Davis
Ruby Dee
Misty Upham
Richard Kiel
Lauren Bacall
Maximilian Schell
Harold Ramis
Casey Kasem
Sumi Haru
Elaine Stritch
James Shigeta
Bob Hoskins
Sid Caesar
Eli Wallach
Russell Johnson
Ralph Waite
Polly Bergen
Richard Attenborough
Don Pardo
Sheila MacRae
James Garner
Marcia Strassman
Marian Seldes
Ed Nelson
Phyllis Frelich
Mary Ann Mobley
Meshach Taylor
Elizabeth Peña
Shirley Temple
Geoffrey Holder
Luise Rainer
Edward Herrmann
Billie Whitelaw
Joan Rivers
Efrem Zimbalist, Jr.
David Brenner
Jan Hooks
Philip Seymour Hoffman
Robin Williams

See also
 4th AACTA International Awards
 67th Primetime Emmy Awards
 72nd Golden Globe Awards
 87th Academy Awards

References

External links

2014
Screen
Screen
Screen Actors Guild
Screen
Screen
January 2015 events in the United States